Spoils or The Spoils may refer to:

 Looting or "the spoils of war", rewards gained through military victory
 Spoils system of distributing government jobs in US politics
 The Spoils (card game), a collectible card game 
 "The Spoils" (Rome), an episode of the television series Rome
 The Spoils (U.S.S.A. album)
 The Spoils (Zola Jesus album)
 The Spoils (band), a band from Australia
 Al-Anfal, "The Spoils", eighth chapter of the Qur'an
 The Spoils of Babylon TV series and its sequel The Spoils Before Dying, collectively
 "The Spoils" (song), a single from British band Massive Attack